Lavinia is the Locus Award-winning novel by American author Ursula K. Le Guin. Published in 2008, it was Le Guin's last novel. It is written in a first-person, self-conscious style that recounts the life of Lavinia, a minor character in Virgil's epic poem the Aeneid.

Synopsis
Lavinia, daughter of the king of the Latins of Laurentum, is sought after by neighbouring kings, but knows she is destined to marry a stranger.  This is Aeneas from the Trojan War, who arrives with a large body of Trojans.

An agreement is made but then breaks down and there is war, which is won by the outnumbered Trojans. They found a new city called Lavinium, but Aeneas is killed after three years.  Aeneas's elder son Ascanius founds Alba Longa and marries but fails to produce an heir.  Lavinia removes her son Silvius from his control and he eventually becomes king of the Latins.

Rome already exists, but as a small settlement that plays no part in events.

Lavinia herself retreats from the world and at the end seems to have turned into an owl.  She has all along regarded the world she lives in as unreal, a product of Virgil's imagination.

Background
The book is based on the last six books, or the Iliadic half, of the Aeneid. It is written in a first-person style, and the character Lavinia is aware that she may only exist in the context of a story which an outside narrator is recounting.

Throughout the first part of the novel Lavinia holds conversations with "the poet", the shade of a dying Virgil. In their conversations Virgil explains his role as the author of Lavinia's life, and what he reveals to Lavinia about her life she acknowledges and anticipates as she recounts her story. Lavinia therefore only exists in the context of the poem, and through her conversations she is self-aware of her own textuality.

This novel is not meant to be history. Le Guin says that, "The Trojan War was probably fought in the thirteenth century BC; Rome was founded, possibly, in the eighth, though there is no proper history of it for centuries after that.  That Priam's nephew Aeneas of Troy had anything at all to do with the founding of Rome is pure legend, a good deal of it invented by Virgil himself". She also explains that her work is a translation of the last six books of the Aeneid into prose.

References
Notes

Bibliography

External links
Lavinia at Worlds Without End
 Interview with Le Guin on The Inkwell Review, on her novel Lavinia.
 Interview with Ramona Koval on The Book Show, ABC Radio National on her novel Lavinia.
 Interview about her Lavinia on National Public Radio's All Things Considered April 26, 2008

2008 American novels
Novels by Ursula K. Le Guin
Historical novels
Novels set in ancient Rome
2008 fantasy novels
Works based on the Aeneid
Novels set in the 12th century BC